Terebu (Turubu) is one of three Kairiru languages spoken in East Sepik Province, Papua New Guinea. It is spoken in Turubu village of Turubu Rural LLG, East Sepik Province.

References

Languages of Papua New Guinea
Schouten languages